Francis Weekes (c. 1616 – 1689), also spelled Wickes, was a founding settler of Providence in what would become the Colony of Rhode Island and Providence Plantations.

Life 
Weekes immigrated to England before 1635 and came to Providence as a minor with John Smith, the miller, from Dorchester, Massachusetts. Weekes, whom Roger Williams called a "poor young fellow," joined Williams and three others at a Seekonk River settlement in 1635 before crossing the river in 1636 to found Providence, Rhode Island. In Providence he received a home lot on Towne Street and some meadow land.  He signed the 1637 Compact and the 1640 Combination with his mark.   

Weekes left Providence by 1645 for New York. In 1645 he was in the settlement established by anabaptist Deborah Moody at Gravesend, Long Island. In 1657 he was a selectman in Hempstead, Long Island.  By 1661 the Weekes family settled in Oyster Bay, Long Island, where Francis owned a home, a home lot, and ten acres of farmland. By 1673 he moved to a home a half mile east of Oyster Bay.    

Weekes's will is dated June 25, 1687, and he died in 1689.

Family 
Weekes married Elizabeth, whose last name is unknown, about 1640. They had eight children between 1641 and 1654: Samuel, John, Joseph, Elizabeth, Anna, Thomas, James, and Daniel. Their children were baptized in the Dutch Church in New Amsterdam, the oldest non-Anglican Protestant church in North America. His wife, Elizabeth, became a Quaker and was fined in 1658 in Hempstead, Long Island, for "meeting in the woods, where there were two Quakers—the one of them as named, the wife of Francis Weekes."

References 

Early colonists in America
People of colonial Rhode Island